Asavtamak (Aśawtamaq) is a rural locality (a village) in Teplyakovsky Selsoviet, Burayevsky District, Bashkortostan, Russia. The population was 100 as of 2010. There are 3 streets.

Geography 
Asavtamak is located 25 km northeast of Burayevo (the district's administrative centre) by road. Maloshukshanovo is the nearest rural locality.

References 

Rural localities in Burayevsky District